Bruce H. McAllister (born March 27, 1971) is a Canadian politician who was an elected member to the Legislative Assembly of Alberta representing the electoral district of Chestermere-Rocky View. After the 2012 Alberta election, McAllister along with 16 other Wildrose MLAs formed the Official Opposition. Wildrose Leader Danielle Smith appointed McAllister as Education and Advanced Education Critic.

After completing a diploma in broadcast journalism from Loyalist College in Belleville, Ontario, McAllister has had a lengthy career in broadcast journalism, working in cities across the country – including Halifax, Winnipeg, Medicine Hat, and Victoria. From 2004 to autumn 2011 (immediately prior to running in the 2012 provincial election) he was co-anchor of the morning news program on Global Calgary. McAllister was a popular anchor, however, after eight years of hosting the morning show he made the choice to leave Global Calgary to pursue a career in politics.

McAllister became a Wildrose party member after just a month of looking for work.  McAllister was avid critic of the long seated Alberta PC party and he was particularly effective in criticism of the PC governments lack of education reform.

In the 2012 fall Legislative session as a member of the Wildrose party, McAllister brought forward amendments to the Education Act that would have ended school fees for mandatory curriculum activities, and would have guaranteed the rights of teachers to grade students with a zero where warranted.

On December 17, 2014, he was one of nine Wildrose MLAs who defected from the Wildrose party and crossed the floor to join the Alberta Progressive Conservative caucus.  On December 18, 2014, the President of the Chestermere-Rocky View PC constituency association said that "...people in our constituency right now that are lost.  They are dumbfounded..."  By February however, McAllister was soon welcomed by PC Party leadership in Edmonton as one of their own even though local support remained questionable.

In March 2015, in the pre-writ period of that year's election, McAllister had two declared competitors for the riding of Chestermere-Rocky View.  One was Jamie Lall, a long time PC party member and local resident, competing against McAllister for the PC nomination.   The other was Leela Aheer, who was running as the Wildrose candidate.

While some in the PC party continued to be critical of McAllister's decision to change parties without a democratic process, he remained confident in his decision; “Although I can’t speak for all of them, those people that wrote cheques and supported me as a Wildrose MLA, to the large degree, those same people will be writing cheques for me as a PC MLA".

In February 2015 several high profile PC party members including the Premier came to Chestermere with McAllister in campaign-style event that was geared to supporting the local PC party including McAllister.  On March 23, 2015, McAllister voted in favour of the Tories' 2015–16 Alberta budget which contained the largest cumulative tax increase and the largest annual budget deficit in Alberta history.

McAllister was defeated in the 2015 election by Wildrose candidate Leela Aheer.

Electoral history

References

External links
 Right Angle Communications & Consulting website

1971 births
Living people
Wildrose Party MLAs
Canadian television news anchors
Canadian television reporters and correspondents
Journalists from New Brunswick
Politicians from Fredericton
Progressive Conservative Association of Alberta MLAs
21st-century Canadian politicians